The 1970 Hardy Cup was the 1970 edition of the Canadian intermediate senior ice hockey championship.

Final
Best of 5
Powell River 6 Val D'Or 4
Val D'Or 6 Powell River 2
Val d'Or 3 Powell River 2
Powell River 10 Val D'Or 5
Powell River 5 Val D'Or 3

Powell River Regals beat Val D'Or Olympiques 3–2 on series.

Eastern Playdowns

Teams
Northern Ontario: Val D'Or Olympiques
Ottawa District: Morrisburg Combines
Quebec: Dolbeau Barons
Newfoundland: Labrador City Carol Lakers

Playdowns

Western Playdowns

Teams
British Columbia: Powell River Regals
Alberta: Lloydminster Border Kings
Saskatchewan: Rosetown Red Wings
Manitoba: Thompson Hawks

Playdowns

External links
Hockey Canada

Hardy Cup
Hardy